Minwax Company is a manufacturer of architectural coatings.

History 
Minwax was founded in 1904 by Arthur B Harrison. Harrison persuaded his employer at Clifford I. Miller to manufacture a line of waterproofing materials, and later bought the line in 1910.

References

External links 

Companies based in Cleveland
Manufacturing companies established in 1904
Manufacturing companies based in Ohio